Eileen Meade Daily (March 3, 1943 – July 30, 2015) was an American politician who served in the Connecticut Senate from 1993 to 2013.

Daily was born in Boston on March 3, 1943. She was raised in Dorchester, and moved to Westbrook, Connecticut, in 1974. From 1983 to 1989, Daily was a member of the Westbrook Board of Education. She subsequently served on the board of selectmen until 1991, when she was elected first selectwomen of Westbrook. Daily was first elected to the Connecticut Senate from district 33 in 1992. Following her lung cancer diagnosis, Daily announced in May 2012 that she would not stand for reelection later that year.

Daily died of lung cancer at the Connecticut Hospice in Branford on July 30, 2015. Westbrook station was rededicated in March 2017 in Daily's honor.

References

1943 births
2015 deaths
Deaths from cancer in Connecticut
Deaths from lung cancer
Connecticut Democrats
Women mayors of places in Connecticut
Connecticut city council members
School board members in Connecticut
Politicians from Boston
People from Westbrook, Connecticut
Women state legislators in Connecticut
Women city councillors in Connecticut
21st-century American women